JK Technosoft is an IT services company, part of JK Organisation.

The company was established in 1988, JK Technosoft is a global provider of digital and IT services. JK Technosoft is part of the JK Organisation founded by Lala Kamlapat Singhania, a member of the Singhania family from Kanpur, Uttar Pradesh India.

Awards
JK Technosoft won the Stevie Award for the Company of the Year 2022 in computer services category.
Asian Leadership Award presented JK Tech with Best Tech in Health by 20th Asia Edition of Asian Leadership Award 2022.
Golden Bridge Business and Innovation Award winner 2021 and 2022.

References

Consulting firms established in 1988
Information technology consulting firms of India
Information technology companies of India
Indian companies established in 1988
Companies based in Noida
Software companies of India
1988 establishments in Uttar Pradesh
Indian brands